Stanborough School is a coeducational independent day and boarding school in Watford, Hertfordshire, England. Situated in 40 acres of parkland in the village of Garston, it was founded by the Seventh-day Adventist church and remains under the governance of the church. It is a member of the Independent Schools Association.

It is a part of the Seventh-day Adventist education system, the world's second largest Christian school system.

History 
Stanborough School was founded in 1919. It originally catered primarily to the children of overseas missionaries. Over the years, the school began to cater for a wider range of students. As the school grew, the Primary section moved to a new facility in 1974 and an Early Learning Unit was added in 1990. The construction of a new complex for secondary and boarding students was completed in 1991.

Facilities 
The boarding school occupies a section of the main school building. All the bedrooms have en-suite facilities with either a shower and toilet. The shared bedrooms are of varying sizes and can accommodate two or three boarders. The boarders are separated by gender with the boys on the first floor and the girls on the second floor.

Boarders have access to all communal facilities. The communal area in the first floor has computers for the boarders to use, logging in with their school account. For those with their own laptop wireless internet is available; main school network is accessible throughout the provided computers. Boarders can communicate with their family and friends via e-mail, Skype or social media. Boarders share the main school cafeteria for their main meals. Under the school policy the main meals are strictly vegetarian. However, in the recreational lounge is a mini kitchen where boarders can prepare their own meals and snacks. Not all the boarders are vegetarian.

The boarders have access to the school gymnasium, with supervision.

The local amenities include the Medical Centre and the supermarkets, which are within walking distance.

Student life 
There are a wide range of clubs as well as a fine choir and ensemble. Peripatetic teachers offer tuition in a wide range of instruments. Some pupils in years 7 to 9 participate in drama and choir, with performances throughout the year and a major International Arts Festival held in the summer term. All pupils are placed in one of three Houses.

Academics 
Currently, Stanborough School has a student body of around 57 pupils. The school has an enrolment representing 40 different nationalities.[8]

Between 2011 and 2016, the average GCSE result was 81%.

Performance Context (2018/19)

GCSE 
Independent School average 54.7%

Stanborough Secondary School 63%

Stanborough School is a mixed ability school with a high international enrolment.

Most pupils move on to university upon completion of Advanced Levels.

International Stanborough School (This associate school closed on 23/08/2019) 
International Stanborough School makes provision for students for who are learning to speak English as an additional language. It is separately registered with the Department for Education but shares the campus and facilities as the main school. Both are owned by the British Union Conference of Seventh-day Adventists. The main purpose of the international school is to help students develop the necessary fluency and competency in English to transfer to the main school. More than half of the current students come from Hong Kong or Korea and the rest from six other countries. The school shares staffing and all facilities with the main secondary school.

A member of staff meets with parents when representing the international school during visits to Hong Kong.

Gallery

References

External links 
Stanborough School homepage
Stanborough School – IB World School homepage
Profile on the ISC website
Secondary School – ISI Inspection Reports & Ofsted Boarding Inspection Reports
Primary School Ofsted Inspection Reports

See also

 List of Seventh-day Adventist secondary and elementary schools
 Seventh-day Adventist education
 Seventh-day Adventist Church
 Seventh-day Adventist theology
 History of the Seventh-day Adventist Church

Private schools in Hertfordshire
Secondary schools affiliated with the Seventh-day Adventist Church
Boarding schools in Hertfordshire
Educational institutions established in 1902
International Baccalaureate schools in England
Member schools of the Independent Schools Association (UK)
1902 establishments in England